Acmispon argyraeus, synonym Lotus argyraeus, is a species of legume native to California and northwest Mexico. It is known by the common name canyon bird's-foot trefoil. It occurs in dry mountain habitat. It is a perennial herb lined with leaves each made up of a few oval leaflike leaflets about 1 cm long. Most of the plant is silky-hairy in texture. The inflorescence holds one to three pinkish-yellow flowers roughly 1 cm long. The fruit is a dehiscent legume pod up to 2.5 cm long.

References

External links
Jepson Manual Treatment
USDA Plants Profile
Photo gallery

argyraeus
Flora of California
Flora of Northwestern Mexico
Flora without expected TNC conservation status